The James H. Mann House is a historic house at 23 Hancock Street in Winchester, Massachusetts.  The -story wood-frame house was built by James H. Mann for his own use.  Mann was a prominent local builder who also built the Carr-Jeeves House, another picturesque house with a mixture of architectural elements.  This house is predominantly Gothic Revival in character, with its main body topped by a double roof roughly looking like a monitor.  There is a three-story tower topped by a jerkin-headed roof, whose gable lines are decorated by Stick-style vergeboard.

The house was listed on the National Register of Historic Places in 1989.

See also
National Register of Historic Places listings in Winchester, Massachusetts

References

Houses on the National Register of Historic Places in Winchester, Massachusetts
Houses in Winchester, Massachusetts